Dodman may refer to:

 Dodman, local English vernacular word for a land snail
 Dodman Island, off the west coast of Graham Land, Antarctica
 Dodman Point, headland near Mevagissey, Cornwall, UK